Bellini is an Italian surname. Bellini may also refer to:

Bellini (cocktail)
Bellini (German band), girl band produced by the Bellini Brothers of the Paffendorf project
Bellini (Italian band), rock band
Favartia bellini,  marine gastropod mollusk in the family Muricidae
Giardino Bellini, urban park of Catania
Piazza Bellini, Naples, plaza located in central Naples, Italy
SS Bellini, Italian cargo ship in service 1925 to 1928
Teatro Massimo Bellini, opera house in Catania, Sicily
Teatro Bellini, Naples, opera house/theatre on Via Vicenzo Bellini in Central Naples
Vellezzo Bellini, comune (municipality) in the Province of Pavia in the Italian region Lombardy